In Greek mythology Agreus or Argeus (Ancient Greek: Ἀγρεύς, Ἀργεύς means 'hunter' or 'wild') and his brother Nomios (Νόμιος means "shepherd") are two of the Pans, creatures multiplied from the god Pan.

Mythology 
They are human in shape, but have the horns of goats. Both were the sons of Hermes, Agreus' mother being the nymph Sose, a prophetess: he inherited his mother's gift of prophecy, and was also a skilled hunter. Nomios' mother was the dryad Penelope (not the same as the wife of Odysseus). He was an excellent shepherd, a seducer of nymphs, and musician upon the shepherd's pipes.   Agreus and Nomios could also be understood as epithets of Pan, expressing two different aspects of the prime Pan, reflecting his dual nature as both a wise prophet and a lustful beast. Both Agreus (meaning "hunter") and Nomios (meaning "shepherd") are titles of several agricultural gods, including Aristaeus and Pan himself.

Agreus and Nomios joined the dozen sons of the god Pan to help Dionysus in his wars in India.

In popular culture
Agreus and Nomios are both characters in Castlevania: Lords of Shadow 2.

Notes

References 

 Diodorus Siculus, The Library of History translated by Charles Henry Oldfather. Twelve volumes. Loeb Classical Library. Cambridge, Massachusetts: Harvard University Press; London: William Heinemann, Ltd. 1989. Vol. 3. Books 4.59–8. Online version at Bill Thayer's Web Site
 Diodorus Siculus, Bibliotheca Historica. Vol 1-2. Immanel Bekker. Ludwig Dindorf. Friedrich Vogel. in aedibus B. G. Teubneri. Leipzig. 1888-1890. Greek text available at the Perseus Digital Library.
 Graves, Robert, The Greek Myths, Harmondsworth, London, England, Penguin Books, 1960. 
Graves, Robert, The Greek Myths: The Complete and Definitive Edition. Penguin Books Limited. 2017. 
Nonnus of Panopolis, Dionysiaca translated by William Henry Denham Rouse (1863-1950), from the Loeb Classical Library, Cambridge, MA, Harvard University Press, 1940.  Online version at the Topos Text Project.
 Nonnus of Panopolis, Dionysiaca. 3 Vols. W.H.D. Rouse. Cambridge, MA., Harvard University Press; London, William Heinemann, Ltd. 1940-1942. Greek text available at the Perseus Digital Library.

Greek gods
Mythological hybrids
Greek legendary creatures
Horned deities
Satyrs
Deeds of Pan (god)